The Craving can refer to:

 The Craving (1916 film), a 1916 film directed by Charles Bartlett
 The Craving (1918 film), a 1918 film directed by John Ford
 Craving (2018 film), a 2018 Dutch film
 The Craving (album), the only album released by MD.45